Salegy  is a popular music genre from Madagascar. Originating as a Sub-Saharan African folk music style in the northwestern coastal areas of Madagascar, modern salegy is the genre of Malagasy music that has gained the widest recognition and commercial popularity in the international market. Its sound is considered emblematic of the island. Eusèbe Jaojoby, a Sakalava singer from Anboahangibe , was a key originator of the style and is widely considered the "King of Salegy".       

The contemporary, electrified form of popular salegy originated from traditional acoustic roots in northwestern Madagascar around Mahajanga and Antsiranana in the 1950s. It has been popularized by originators like Jaojoby and relative newcomers such as Ninie Doniah, Vaiavy Chila and Dr. J.B. and the Jaguars. The style is funky and energetic, dominated by ringing electric guitars, real or synthesized accordion, and call-and-response polyphonic vocals, propelled by heavy electric bass and a driving percussion section typically including a drum kit, djembe and shakers. The melody and harmonies are often in the A minor key and feature beautiful high-life electric guitar and synthesized accordion lines. The sound of salegy can be heard at night clubs, cabarets, parties and dance floors across the island.

Salegy represents an electrified version of the antsa musical style that was traditionally performed at Betsimisaraka and Tsimihety rituals. In addition to their commonalities in tempo, vocal style, and tendency toward minor keys (which some attribute to an Arab influence, and which stands in contrast to the major key dominance of Highland music), the salegy shares the antsa's structure in that it always features a middle section called the folaka ("broken") which is primarily instrumental—voice serves only to urge on more energetic dancing—and during which the vocalists (and the audience) will launch into intricate polyrhythmic hand-clapping to the beat of the music.

Artists and bands
Anziza Salema
Arsène Félix
Dr. J.B. and the Jaguars
Fenoamby
Eusèbe Jaojoby
Fredy de Majunga
Gérard Tsapalôko
IO Anay
Jaojoby Junior
Joacin-tapaka
Lazard
Mily Clément
Mister Rotsirotsy
Ninie Doniah
Olga del Madagascar
Paskaal Japhet
SISCA
Tianjama
Vaiavy Chila
Wawa

References

External links 
 Definition

Malagasy musical styles
African music genres
African popular music
Popular music